Marcos Daniel Figueroa (born 18 January 1990) is an Argentine professional footballer who plays as a centre-forward for Temperley.

Career
Rosario Central became Figueroa's first senior club in 2010, he made his professional debut for them in the Argentine Primera División on 15 May against Vélez Sarsfield. In 2011, Figueroa was loaned to Central Córdoba in Primera C Metropolitana. He scored nine times in forty-four fixtures for Central Córdoba. After returning to Rosario Central, Figueroa made the move to fellow Primera División team Argentinos Juniors on 9 July 2012. He scored a hat-trick on his eighth appearance during a 3–3 tie with Unión Santa Fe. July 2013 saw Figueroa join Atlético de Rafaela, where he'd make nineteen appearances.

In June 2014, San Martín (SJ) of Primera B Nacional signed Figueroa. He netted five goals in twenty matches throughout 2014, a season which ended with promotion to the top-flight. He scored seven times in the following campaign, which preceded a move to Temperley in January 2016. During his opening two campaigns with Temperley, Figueroa got ten goals in forty-two fixtures. Temperley suffered relegation to Primera B Nacional in 2017–18, Figueroa subsequently terminated his contract with the club. His last appearance for Temperley, on 12 March 2018 versus Unión Santa Fe, was his 200th career appearance.

Figueroa completed a transfer to San Martín (T) on 30 June; a newly promoted Primera División team. Six months later, on 28 December, Figueroa moved to Chilean football with Cobresal. He featured in a total of nine games in the Chilean Primera División, before going back to his homeland in the succeeding July with Mitre. He left the club at the end of the year, having made five appearances. In March 2020, Figueroa signed for Torneo Federal A team Sportivo Desamparados. However, due to the COVID-19 pandemic, he never appeared. In September 2020, Figueroa rejoined Temperley in Primera B Nacional.

Career statistics
.

References

External links

1990 births
Living people
Footballers from Rosario, Santa Fe
Argentine footballers
Association football forwards
Argentine expatriate footballers
Expatriate footballers in Chile
Argentine expatriate sportspeople in Chile
Argentine Primera División players
Primera Nacional players
Primera C Metropolitana players
Chilean Primera División players
Rosario Central footballers
Central Córdoba de Rosario footballers
Argentinos Juniors footballers
Atlético de Rafaela footballers
San Martín de San Juan footballers
Club Atlético Temperley footballers
San Martín de Tucumán footballers
Cobresal footballers
Club Atlético Mitre footballers
Sportivo Desamparados footballers